Pararhytiphora is a genus of longhorn beetles of the subfamily Lamiinae, containing the following species:

 Pararhytiphora dispar (Blackburn, 1894)
 Pararhytiphora nigropunctata Breuning, 1938
 Pararhytiphora nigrosparsa Breuning, 1938

References

Pteropliini